Blood, Sweat, and No Tears is the first full-length album by the American hardcore punk band Sick of it All, released on July 12, 1989.

Track listing
 "The Blood & The Sweat" – 1:50
 "Clobberin' Time"/"Pay the Price" featuring KRS-One – 1:37
 "Give Respect" – 1:08
 "Breeders of Hate" – 1:12
 "Pushed Too Far" – 1:56
 "Friends Like You" – 1:07
 "B.S. Justice" – 1:30
 "Rat Pack" – 0:44
 "Pete's Sake" – 0:56
 "Stick Together" – 0:51
 "G.I. Joe Headstomp" – 1:19
 "Alone" – 1:58
 "My Life" – 1:42
 "World Full of Hate" – 2:05
 "My Revenge" – 1:12
 "No Labels" – 1:59
 "Disillusion" – 2:05
 "The Deal" – 1:08
 "Injustice System!" – 2:07

Track 2, 3, 5, 6, 7, 9, 15 and 18 are re-recordings of the songs from their first EP, Sick of It All (1987).

Personnel 
 David Bett – art direction
 Lou Koller - vocals
 Rich Cipriano - bass
 Tim Boiling Point – photography
 Chris Gehringer – mastering
 Peter Koller – guitar
 Patricia Lie – design
 Jaime Locke – assistant engineer
 Armand Majidi – drums
 Bryan Martin – remastering
 Dave Muller – photography
 Zack Muller – photography
 B.J. Papas – photography
 Mike Rhode – remix assistant
 Craig Setari – vocals (background)
 Sick of It All – producer

References

1989 debut albums
Sick of It All albums
Relativity Records albums